The Deadline is a 1931 American pre-Code western film directed by Lambert Hillyer and starring Buck Jones and Robert Ellis. It was produced and distributed by Columbia Pictures.

Cast
 Buck Jones as Buck Donlin (as Charles 'Buck' Jones)
 Loretta Sayers as Helen Evans
 Robert Ellis as Ira Coleman (a.k.a. Clink Durand)
 Ed Brady as Lefty (as Edwin J. Brady)
 G. Raymond Nye as Sheriff Grady
 Knute Erickson as Otto
 George Ernest as Jimmy Evans
 Harry Todd as Chloride
 James Curtis as Shores (uncredited)
 James Farley as Cassiday (uncredited)

References

External links
 

1931 films
American black-and-white films
1931 Western (genre) films
Films directed by Lambert Hillyer
American Western (genre) films
1930s English-language films
Columbia Pictures films